Pinnacle of Bedlam is the seventh studio album by American death metal band Suffocation.  It is the band's first full-length record since Pierced from Within to not feature Mike Smith (although he makes a guest appearance on the final track), instead the album features returning drummer Dave Culross, making this his only full-length record with Suffocation and his first release overall with the band since 1998's Despise the Sun.  Track 10, 'Beginning of Sorrow', is a re-recording of the track of the same name from the album Breeding the Spawn. It is also the band's last album with longtime guitarist Guy Marchais.

A limited edition release of the CD included a DVD containing the 75-minute documentary The Making of Pinnacle of Bedlam.

In its first week, the album sold about 3,200 copies and landed at the 152 position on the Billboard 200.

Track listing

Personnel

Suffocation
 Frank Mullen – vocals
 Terrance Hobbs – lead guitar
 Guy Marchais – rhythm guitar
 Derek Boyer – bass
 Dave Culross – drums

Guest musicians
 Mike Smith - drums on track 10

Production
 Joe Cincotta – engineering, production
 Chris "Zeuss" Harris – mixing, mastering

References

Suffocation (band) albums
2013 albums
Nuclear Blast albums